WTR-Ten10 refers to the team partnership between the WTR (San Marino) and Ten10 Racing (Bangalore, India) teams, which is structured on a three-year basis. It was the first team from India to participate in the MotoGP.

Ten10 Racing
Ten10 Racing is a professional motorcycle racing team that was founded in 2008 by Ramji Govindarajan, a former racer, with the goal of providing a platform for young, unrecognized talent in the Indian motorcycle racing scene. The team was launched in the National Championships of 2009 after nearly a year of planning. Govindarajan connected with individuals who shared his passion for the sport and the vision of maintaining motorcycle racing as a serious and professional business model. Ten10 Racing operates with a singular focus on success and the development of champions through the cultivation of talent on the track.

With its champion rider, Sarath Kumar, and its penchant for breaking records and setting benchmarks, Ten10 has showcased its mettle in technical dominance and capabilities in circuit racing. Their entry as the first Indian team in the MotoGP is testament to this.

The team is currently competing in the '165cc' Indian bike category and the 'Superbikes' category in the Indian two-wheeler motorsport scene. The team participated in the Sidvin Indian National Motorcycle Racing Championship and the Malaysian Super Series in 2017.

WTR Team

After much research into Indian motorcycle racing, the WTR team approached Ten10 Racing with the radical idea of an Indian team in the MotoGP. WTR Racing is a respected name in the business and has been participating in the MotoGP since 2004. It officially represents the Republic of San Marino, where the team is based.
The WTR project was born as an initiative by a group passionate about two-wheelers, almost as a bet. However, thanks to passion, that initiative shortly turned from a bet into a real important body within the world championship. Over the years, the commitment and determination of the team and its management led to a boost in experience and achievement of satisfying results.

WTR's run at the MotoGP:

2011 World Championship
Riders 250 - Taro Sekiguchi, Max Sabbatani
Bike - Yamaha TZ 250

2012 World Championship
Riders 125 -  Dario Giuseppetti, Karel Abraham
Bike: Aprilia RS125

2013 World Championship
Riders 125 - Michele Pirro, Andrea Iannone
Riders 250 - Michele Danese, Jordi Carchano
Bikes - Aprilia RS125, Aprilia RS 250

2014 National Championship
Riders 125 - Andrea Iannone, Stefano Bianco
Bike - Aprilia RS 125

2015 National Championship
Riders - Stefano Bianco, Bastien Chesaux
Bike - Aprilia RS125

2016 National Championship
Rider 125 - Johann Zarco
Rider 250 - Alex Baldolini
Bikes - Aprilia RS125, Aprilia RS250

Events

JK Tyre FMSCI National Racing Championship in Chennai (2011)
Rolon Indian National Motorcycle Racing Championship in Chennai (2012)
FIM Asia Roadracing Championship in Chennai - Wildcard entry (2013)
The Sidvin Indian National Motorcycle Racing Championship 2010 - INMRC (2014)
MRF International Cup (2015)
MECO Endurance Cup (2016)
Malaysia Super Series of FOS Cup - Round 1 (2017)

Riders

Events

Sidvin Indian National Motorcycle Racing Championship
Ten10 Racing participated in almost all classes in the Sidvin Indian National Motorcycle Racing Championship 2017 (INMRC)and registered the fastest laps at Saturday's qualifying, with riders securing Pole in all 3 categories - Group D (stock category), Group B (modified category for Indian bikes) and Group A (220cc Supersport). Sujay SK. qualified 3rd on his 200cc bike and was placed in the front row on the grid, whereas, Sameer V. qualified 6th on the grid.

JK Tyre FMSCI National Racing Championship
Ten10 Racing made their presence felt in their first race at the historic Irungattukottai Track on August 1–2, 2009 with two podium finishes in both the Group 'A' Superbike races at the JK Tyre FMSCI National Racing Championship.

WTR-Ten10
The Ten10 Racing Team joined with the Sammarinese WTR Team to enter the world of MotoGP in the 125cc class for 2011 MotoGP season

Ten10 Racing that has tied up with the San Marino-based WTR Team for a provisional entry in the 125cc class. The joint venture will be called WTR-Ten10 Racing Team. The team will be field two riders, one Indian (S. Sarath Kumar) and one Italian (Francesco Mauriello). This is the first time that an Indian rider will make it to the MotoGP grid.
These developments mark India's entry onto the global motorcycle motorsport. The country prepares to hold its first motorcycle GP in 2012 at the Jaypee Circuit in Greater Noida. The contract includes a 3-year deal of technical-commercial partnership between the two teams. The team is named "WTR-Ten10 Racing Team", a wanted choice aimed at representing the strong cohesion of the partnership: passion for the sport, same principles, ambitions and future growth expectations are the values commonly shared together. Besides entry into the 125cc class, both the teams will continue to race in the upcoming Moto3 class for 2012 and also look at getting into the Moto2 category in due course.

MotoGP
Road Racing World Championship Grand Prix is the premier championship of motorcycle road racing and is currently divided into three distinct classes: 125cc, Moto2 and MotoGP. The 125cc class uses a two-stroke engine.125cc machines are restricted to a single cylinder and a minimum weight of 80 kilograms. First instituted in 2005, all riders in the 125cc class can not be older than 28 years or 25 years for new contracted riders participating for the first time and wild. The 125cc class will be replaced in 2012 by the Moto3 class. This class will be restricted to single cylinder 250cc 4-stroke engines with a maximum bore of 81 mm. Ten10's partnership with WTR enables it to gain entry into the MotoGP in the 125cc class.

References

External links
 Official website

Motorcycle racing teams
Motorcycle racing teams established in 2008
2008 establishments in India
Motorcycle racing teams disestablished in 2017
2017 disestablishments in India